Kungsängen is a locality and the seat of Upplands-Bro Municipality, Stockholm County, Sweden with 9,382 inhabitants in 2010.

References 

Populated lakeshore places in Sweden
Populated places in Upplands-Bro Municipality
Municipal seats of Stockholm County
Swedish municipal seats
Metropolitan Stockholm